Carly Booth (born 21 June 1992) is a Scottish professional golfer. At the end of 2009, aged 17, she became the youngest-ever Scot to qualify for the Ladies European Tour. Booth became the youngest ladies' club champion in Britain at the age of 11 at Dunblane New.

Early life
Upon turning professional, Booth had a golf scholarship to complete at Glenalmond College in Scotland. She started there after returning from America, where a stay at David Leadbetter's Academy in Florida was followed by a spell at a school in Arizona. As a youngster, Booth was able to practice on the course made exclusively for her and her brother, professional golfer Wallace, by her father Wally at the family farm near Comrie. Wally was a Commonwealth Games silver medallist wrestling champion.

Amateur career
Booth enjoyed an amateur career richly laced with records and accolades, being described as a Scottish golfing prodigy. Aged 12, she played with Sandy Lyle in the British Masters Pro-Am and at 14 she appeared in her first professional event, the Ladies Scottish Open, and finished 13th. She was rated the No. 1 junior in Europe after winning the European Junior Masters in 2007, the same year she lifted the Scottish Under-18 and Under-21 titles. In 2008, she became the youngest player to represent Great Britain & Ireland in the 76-year history of the Curtis Cup, facing the Americans in the 35th staging of that match at St Andrews. She also played at the Junior Ryder Cup in 2006 and 2008 and won the Daily Telegraph Finals in 2007 and 2008. In 2010, she finished 14th at LET Final Stage Qualifying School for 2010.

Professional career
Booth made her professional debut on the Ladies European Tour at the Lalla Meryem Cup in Morocco. She won her first event in May 2012 at the Aberdeen Asset Management Ladies Scottish Open. She won her second event in June at the Deutsche Bank Ladies Swiss Open. Booth did not achieve her third win on the Ladies European tour until August 2019, when she won the Tipsports Czech Ladies Open.

Other activities
She appeared nude in the 2013 ESPN The Magazines "Body Issue".

Booth is supporting John Junior, mental health activist, with their mental health campaign, to make dialectical behaviour therapy more widely available on the NHS. DBT aims to identify and change negative thought patterns, it pushes for a more positive behavioural change, its used for people with a range of mental health, including people with self destructive behaviours.

Amateur wins
Ladies Home International: 2007 & 2009
Scottish Girls U18: 2007 & 2008
Scottish Girls U21: 2007
Daily Telegraph Finals: 2007 & 2008
European Young Master: 2007

Professional wins (4)
Ladies European Tour (3)

LET Access Series wins (2)
2012 Dinard Ladies Open
2019 Tipsports Czech Ladies Open^

^ Dual-ranked by the Ladies European Tour and LET Access Series

Team appearancesAmateurEuropean Girls' Team Championship(representing Scotland): 2005
Junior Ryder Cup (representing Europe): 2006 (tie, Cup retained), 2008
Curtis Cup (representing Great Britain & Ireland): 2008
European Ladies' Team Championship (representing Scotland): 2009Professional'
The Queens (representing Europe): 2017

References

External links

 Official Website 
Carly Booth on Instagram  

Scottish female golfers
Ladies European Tour golfers
People educated at Glenalmond College
People from Perth and Kinross
1992 births
Living people